Igor Mitoraj (26 March 1944 – 6 October 2014) was a Polish artist and sculptor. Known for his fragmented sculptures of the human body often created for large-scale public installations, he is considered one of the most internationally recognized Polish sculptors.

Biography
Mitoraj was born on 26 March 1944 in Oederan, Germany. His Polish mother was a forced labourer, while his father was a French officer of Polish extraction. He returned with his mother to Poland after the end of World War II. He spent his childhood years in  Grojec. He graduated from an art school in Bielsko-Biała and in 1963 he studied painting at the Kraków Academy of Art under Tadeusz Kantor. After graduating, he had several joint exhibitions, and held his first solo exhibition in 1967 at the Krzysztofory Gallery in Poland. In 1968, he moved to Paris to continue his studies at the National School of Art.

Shortly afterwards, he became fascinated by Latin American art and culture, spending a year painting and travelling around Mexico. The experience led him to take up sculpture.

He returned to Paris in 1974 and two years later he held another major solo exhibition at the Gallery La Hune, including some sculptural work. The success of the show persuaded him that he was first and foremost a sculptor.

Having previously worked with terracotta and bronze, a trip to Carrara, Italy, in 1979 turned him to using marble as his primary medium and in 1983 he set up a studio in Pietrasanta. In 2006, he created the new bronze doors and a statue of John the Baptist for the basilica of Santa Maria degli Angeli in Rome.

In 2003 he returned to Poland.

In 2005 he received the Golden Medal of Medal for Merit to Culture - Gloria Artis 2012 he received the Commander's Cross of the Order of Polonia Restituta.

Style
Mitoraj's sculptural style is rooted in the classical tradition with its focus on the well modelled torso. However, Mitoraj introduced a post-modern twist with ostentatiously truncated limbs, emphasising the damage sustained by most genuine classical sculptures. Often his works aim to address the questions of human body, its beauty and fragility, its suffering as well as deeper aspects of human nature, which as a result of the passing of time undergo degeneration.

Gallery

References

External links

 Emociones da Trajano. Video by Leandro Manuel Emede shot in Roma at Mercati di Traiano
 more pics of Mitoraj's sculptures
 Igor Mitoraj. Rzeźba i rysunek

Contini Art UK
Igor Mitoraj at Art Gallery Katarzyna Napiórkowska in Poland

1944 births
2014 deaths
Polish sculptors
Polish male sculptors
Polish contemporary artists
Modern sculptors
Jan Matejko Academy of Fine Arts alumni
Commanders of the Order of Polonia Restituta
Recipients of the Gold Medal for Merit to Culture – Gloria Artis